Hals is a crater on Mercury. It has a diameter of 93 kilometers. Its name was adopted by the International Astronomical Union (IAU) in 1985. Hals is named for the Dutch painter Frans Hals, who lived from 1581 to 1666.

The crater Hawthorne is north of Hals.

References

Impact craters on Mercury